Frank Obadiah Briggs (August 12, 1851May 8, 1913) was the Mayor of Trenton, New Jersey from 1899 to 1902. He was a United States senator from New Jersey from 1907 to 1913.

Biography
He was born on August 12, 1851 in Concord, New Hampshire to James Frankland Briggs.

He attended the public schools, Francestown Academy, and Phillips Exeter Academy. He was graduated from the United States Military Academy in 1872 and served in the Second Regiment, United States Infantry, as second lieutenant until 1877, when he resigned from the Army.

In 1877, he moved to Trenton, New Jersey and engaged in the manufacture of wire and wire products; he was a member of the Trenton School Board from 1884 to 1892 and was Mayor of Trenton, New Jersey from 1899 to 1902. In 1901 and 1902, he was a member of the New Jersey State Board of Education, and was New Jersey State Treasurer from 1902 to 1907.

Briggs was Chairman of the New Jersey Republican State Committee from 1904 to 1907 and again from 1910 until his death in 1913. He was elected as a Republican to the U.S. Senate, serving from March 4, 1907, to March 3, 1913; he was an unsuccessful candidate for reelection.

While in the Senate, he was chairman of the Committee on Geological Survey (Sixty-first Congress) and a member of the Committee to Audit and Control the Contingent Expense (Sixty-second Congress). He resumed his former business pursuits in Trenton, where he died in 1913, aged 61. He was buried in Riverview Cemetery.

References

External links

Frank Obadiah Briggs entry at The Political Graveyard

1851 births
1913 deaths
Chairmen of the New Jersey Republican State Committee
Mayors of Trenton, New Jersey
Politicians from Concord, New Hampshire
Republican Party United States senators from New Jersey
United States Military Academy alumni
New Jersey Republicans
State treasurers of New Jersey
19th-century American politicians